Noia is a comarca in the Galician Province of A Coruña. The overall population of this  local region is 33,054 (2019).

Municipalities
Lousame, Noia, Outes and Porto do Son.

References 

Comarcas of the Province of A Coruña